The following is a list of rugby union stadiums in England. The stadiums are organised by capacity, which is the maximum number of spectators the stadium can normally accommodate. Capacities are standard total capacity, including seats and any standing areas, and excluding any temporary seating. All stadiums with a capacity of 3,000 or more are included and host Premiership, RFU Championship and National League 1 games for the 2016–17 season. Some of the stadiums below host other sports and events in addition to rugby union. Stadiums which have only hosted rugby union games for one-off occasions, such as the King Power Stadium and Wembley Stadium, have been omitted from the list.

National Stadium 

Twickenham Stadium is the national rugby union stadium of England, being the home ground of the England national team. Twickenham also hosts the Final of the Premiership Playoffs with the winner being crowned Champions. Additionally Twickenham hosts special one-off home games for some of the Premiership clubs, including Saracens, Harlequins and Bath.

Premiership Rugby 
Below is a list of rugby union stadiums used in Premiership Rugby during the 2020-21 season. There are 14 stadiums in total, with 12 of them representing the permanent home ground of each Premiership side. The newest Stadium is the Brentford Community Stadium the new home of London Irish.

RFU Championship and National League 1 
Below is a list of rugby union stadiums ordered by capacity from the RFU Championship and National League 1, which are the 2nd and 3rd tiers in the English Rugby Union Pyramid.

See also 

 List of rugby union stadiums by capacity
 List of Australian rugby union stadiums by capacity
 List of rugby union stadiums in France
 List of Super Rugby stadiums
 List of rugby league stadiums by capacity

References

Rugby union stadiums in England
British rugby union lists